The siege of Dongnae was a siege that occurred on April 15, 1592 (Gregorian: May 25, 1592) during the Japanese invasions of Korea (1592–98). It resulted in the capture of Dongnae, a mountain castle on the way to Hanseong (Seoul), by the Japanese.

Background
After the fall of Busan, the Japanese army had to secure their bridgehead, because ten kilometres to the north of Busan lay the fortress of Dongnae, a certain type of castle that was situated within a very strong position atop a hill, that dominates the main road north towards Hanseong. Dongnae was a walled citadel on a hilltop commanded by the 41-year-old prefect, Song Sang-hyeon, and the castle was packed with over 20,000 soldiers, poorly trained and equipped conscripts, and panicked civilian refugees from Busan and surrounding areas.

The march and the siege of Dongnae
After resting overnight at Busan, the First Division left at 6:00 AM the following morning, marched around the bay without delay, and arrived at Dongnae around 8 AM two hours later. Its prefect, Song Sang-hyeon, hurriedly gathered all the town-people and what soldiers he could find such as Jo Yeong Gyu, the magistrate of Yangsan. As soon as the Japanese completed the investment of the fortress surrounding it in five lines, with other troops crowding on the nearby fields and prepared to storm the fortress. The brave prefect took up his position in the upper story of the great gate of the fortress where, in accordance with the Korean custom, he beat upon a great drum and urged on his soldiers in the fight. Konishi Yukinaga presented the Japanese demands erected a certain message saying, "Fight if you want to, or let us pass", for a clear road through to China. It was again rejected by the brave prefect with the words, "It is easy for me to die, but difficult to let you pass”. Konishi Yukinaga then followed in personally leading the attack against Dongnae, in which he ordered for the commander to be captured alive.

The battle
The battle began soon after 8 AM. Per Japanese accounts it lasted for four hours, and per Korean accounts it lasted for twelve. The besieged Koreans, including women, fired arrows and spears at the Japanese as Song beat a drum from the upper floor of his donjon to urge the defenders on. Even though the men that Song Sang-hyeon wielded were rather ill-equipped and poorly trained, the gallant defenders fought for eight hours before the enemy effected an entrance over their dead bodies. However, as was the case at Busan, the superior firepower of the Japanese arquebus decimated the defenders. During a lull in the fighting, a Japanese vanguard of 100 men scaled the walls with ladders and the rest followed, taking the castle in hand-to-hand combat. Song Sang-hyeon was captured, but when he refused to bow, he was hacked to death. Per Japanese sources, Japanese casualties included 100 killed and 400 wounded, whereas Korean losses were over 5,000. According to Korean sources, at least 3,000 of the defenders were killed and 500 were taken prisoner.

The fall
When Yi Gak, the cautious, and Gen. Bak Hong who was with him, heard the fall of Dongnae, they took their heels and consequently their force did likewise. After the fall of Dongnae many people were killed, which implies a massacre similar to that what happened at Busan.

Aftermath
Konishi's deputy, Sō Yoshitoshi, had hoped that Song Sang-hyeon would have been captured alive, as he had been hospitably treated by Song during his prewar visits to Korea. On learning of Song's death, he ordered that his body be buried in a marked grave on the hillside behind the castle, where it was later reclaimed by his family members.

On 26 May, Sō Yoshitoshi sent a scout force to Yangsan Castle, the next point on the road to Hanseong. The scouts frightened the defenders so much with gunfire that they abandoned their posts and fled. The castle was taken the following morning.

Konishi Yukinaga's army left Dongnae in the afternoon for Miryang, the next castle on the road, and took it after a minor skirmish. After that he took the undefended Daegu on 28 May and crossed the also undefended Nakdong River before receiving news of a Joseon army awaiting him at Sangju.

Gyeongsang Right Navy Commander Won Gyun was in a state of panic on learning of the fall of Busan and Dongnae and the self-destruction of the Gyeongsang Left Navy fleet by Commander Bak Hong. He attempted to withdraw his ships to Hansando but mistook a bunch of fishing ships for the Japanese fleet. He proceeded to destroy his weapons and stores, and to scuttle his fleet. He was dissuaded from deserting his command by his subordinates, by which time he had only four vessels remaining 

With the fall of Dongnae the Japanese bridgehead was secured and the road to the north was open. Busan and Dongnae fortress were quickly garrisoned, and the harbor of Busan began to provide a safe and almost unchallenged landing stage to disembark more than 100,000 Japanese soldiers with their equipment, horses, and supplies over the next month.

Legend
The Japanese general in command So Yoshitoshi was so impressed with the bravery of this prefect that he had his body decently buried and erected over his grave a wooden monument on which he wrote “A Loyal Subject”, an epitaph than which none could be more grateful to a true Korean gentleman.

The cool defiance of Song Sang-hyeon has become a legend in Korea, and in the Chungnyolsa shrine at the foot of the castle hill in Dongnae, where he is honored beside Jeong Bal and Yun Heung-sin, there is a dramatic painting of him sitting impassively in his chair as the fierce Japanese approach.

See also
 List of castles in Korea
List of battles during the Japanese invasions of Korea (1592–1598)
Timeline of the Japanese invasions of Korea

Citations

Bibliography

 
 
 
 
 
 
 
 
 
 
 桑田忠親 [Kuwata, Tadachika], ed., 舊參謀本部編纂, [Kyu Sanbo Honbu], 朝鮮の役 [Chousen no Eki]　(日本の戰史 [Nihon no Senshi] Vol. 5), 1965.
 
 
 
 
 
 
 
 
 
 
 
 
  
 
 
 
 
 
 

Dongnae
1592 in Asia
1592 in Japan
Dongnae
Dongnae
Conflicts in 1592